Mont Faron is a mountain overlooking the city and roadstead of Toulon, France.  It is 584m high.  At its peak is a memorial dedicated to the 1944 Allied landings in Provence (Operation Dragoon), and to the liberation of Toulon.

The top can be reached either by a cable car from Toulon, or by a steep and narrow road which ascends from the west side and descends on the east side. The road is one of the most challenging stages of the annual Paris–Nice and Tour Méditerranéen bicycle races. From 1952 to 1970, there was a Mont Faron hill climb time trial race.

Near the summit there is a zoo which covers an area of 1.5 hectares.

Hill climb

References

External links

  Mont Faron - Official Site
  Photos Le Revest
  Faron Zoo
  Faron cablecar site
  Site on the memorial
  Vidéo Toulon - view from Mont Faron
  The "montée du Faron", pedestrian route on Easter Sunday.
  Photos
  Tourist site on Faron
  Fire on Mont Faron

Toulon
Landforms of Var (department)
Mountains of the Alps
Mountains of Provence-Alpes-Côte d'Azur